2018 Shonan Bellmare season.

Squad
.

Out on loan

J1 League

References

External links
 J.League official site

Shonan Bellmare
Shonan Bellmare seasons